The 2007 African U-17 Championship qualification was a men's under-17 football competition which decided the participating teams of the 2007 African U-17 Championship.

Preliminary round
The first leg matches were played on either the 14th, 15th, 16th or 17 July 2006. The second leg matches were played on 29 July 2006. The winners advanced to the First Round.

|}

First round
The first leg matches were played on either the 16th or 17 September 2006. The second leg matches were played on 14 October 2006. The winners advanced to the Second Round.

|}

Second round
The first leg matches were played on either the 24th, 25th or 26 November 2006. The second leg matches were played on 9th or 10 December 2006. The winners advanced to the Finals.

|}

Qualified teams
 
 
 
 
 
 
   (host nation)

References

External links
 RSSSF.com: African U-17 Championship 2007

Qual
Under-17 Championship Qualification, 2007
2007